"Kentucky Woman" is a 1967 song written and originally recorded by Neil Diamond.

Background
Diamond recorded "Kentucky Woman" as his last hit single for Bang Records. The song was mixed in monophonic, which is the common version heard on all Neil Diamond compilations featuring original Bang singles. The only known stereo mix was done in 1978 for a Frog King/Columbia House album called Early Classics, which has never been released on CD.

Chart history
Released in October 1967, it reached number 22 on the U.S. pop singles chart, number 58 on the Australian charts, and number 6 on the Canadian charts.

Deep Purple cover

Another well-known version is the 1968 recording by Deep Purple. The group's cover had vastly different instrumental feel, if not vocal line. It was their second single release in 1968. It managed to reach #38 on the Billboard Hot 100, #21 Canadian RPM charts, and #27 on the Australian Singles Chart where it was released as a double A-Side with "Hush."

The single version is an edit of the album version and is four minutes and four seconds in length.  Cash Box said that it has a "heavy dance beat and a splendid instrumental burst." A remastered version appears on the 30th anniversary album The Very Best of Deep Purple and runs a full four minutes and forty five seconds. Both those versions end on a fadeout. The album version, which does not fade out at the end, is 5 minutes and 31 seconds in length.

Deep Purple played "Kentucky Woman" live on tour in 1968 and 1969, even after Ian Gillan and Roger Glover joined the band in the summer of 1969. It has never been on Deep Purple's set list since. The song was also featured in Quentin Tarantino's 2019 film and soundtrack for Once Upon a Time in Hollywood.

Other covers
Waylon Jennings also released a version on his 1968 album, Only the Greatest. 
Gary Puckett & The Union Gap included a cover of the song on their first album, Woman, Woman.

References

1967 singles
1968 singles
Songs written by Neil Diamond
Neil Diamond songs
Deep Purple songs
Gary Puckett & The Union Gap songs
1967 songs
Bang Records singles
Harvest Records singles
Songs about Kentucky